Scott Thomas (born 30 October 1974) is an English former professional footballer who played as a midfielder.

Career
In his brief seven-year career, Thomas notably played in the Premier League for Manchester City and had spells on loan with Richmond Kickers and Brighton & Hove Albion. In 1999 he briefly moved to non-league side Northwich Victoria.

Thomas suffered a broken leg whilst playing with Richmond, which later lead to his retirement.

Personal life
He is the father of former Manchester City and current Leeds United youth team player Luca Thomas.

Thomas went on to run and own a gym in Bolton.

References

External links

Since 1888... The Searchable Premiership and Football League Player Database (subscription required)

1974 births
Living people
English footballers
Association football midfielders
Premier League players
Manchester City F.C. players
Brighton & Hove Albion F.C. players
Northwich Victoria F.C. players
Richmond Kickers players